Gregory Taronites was an Armenian prince who became a senior Byzantine general.

Gregory Taronites may also refer to:

 Gregory Taronites (governor of Chaldia), governor of the theme of Chaldia, who unsuccessfully rebelled against Alexios I Komnenos
 Gregory Taronites (protovestiarios), palace official and one of the chief ministers of John II Komnenos